The Fucking Hits is the first compilation album by hip-hop duo The Outhere Brothers.

Track listing
"Premier Ohb Megamixxxx"
"La La La Hey Hey" (Pegasus Remix 1)
"Boom Boom Boom" (Ohb Underground Part 2)
"Pass the Toilet Paper" (Whodidit Remix)
"Ole Ole (Let Me Hear You Say)" (Sequential One)
"De Da De Da De (We Like to Party)" (Ohb Ext)
"Don't Stop (Wiggle Wiggle)" (Ohb Club Mix)
"Ae-Ah" (Andy & The Lamboy radio edit)
"Fuck U in the Ass" (Remix)"
"Pass the Toilet Paper" (Klimaxxx Remix)
"Ole Ole (Let Me Hear You Say)" (Phat N Phunky 1)
"Ae-Ah" (2 in the Rhythm Hard House Mix)
"Boom Boom Boom (Hip Hop Long)"
"Don't Stop (Wiggle Wiggle)" (E-Smoove House Mix)
"La La La Hey Hey" (Ospina in La Casa Mix)
"Fuck U in the Ass" (Pegasus Remix)
"Boom Boom Boom" (Itchy & Scratchy Dub Mix)
"Ole Ole (Let Me Hear You Say)" (Ohb Extended)
"De Da De Da De (We Like to Party)" (Real Mc)
"Pass the Toilet Paper" (Aladino Remix)
"Ae-Ah" (Dj Greek Dark Club Mix)
"Don't Stop (Wiggle Wiggle)" (Dfc Techno Remix)
"La La La Hey Hey" (Warlord Tweak Dub)
"Fuk U in the Ass" (Safe Sex Mix)
"Boom Boom Boom" (Tfx Long Mix)
"De Da De Da De (We Like to Party)" (Ext Par)

2003 compilation albums
The Outhere Brothers compilation albums